Street Photography Now is a survey book of contemporary street photography, edited by Sophie Howarth and Stephen McLaren and published by Thames & Hudson in 2010. It includes work by 56 photographers. Blake Andrews described the book as "the first broad street photography book to be published since Bystander in 1994". Between 2010 and 2012, a series of exhibitions were held in Europe with work from the book.

Book content
It also includes four essays and a transcript of a conversation between Lezmi, Marlow, Alor Powell, Gus Powell, Russell, Tang and Turpin.

The selection of photographers seemed biased to Andrews:

. . . Street Photography Now seems intimately tied to the web. . . . The selection of photographers seems young, global, and web-savvy, with a substantial dose of HCSP, Flickr, and In-Public members. / Meanwhile, some street stalwarts who aren't daily participants in the online world are left out, e.g., Charles Traub, Sylvia Plachy, Daido Moriyama, [Lee] Friedlander, and Henry Wessel, not to mention the patron saint of candid street photography, Elliott Erwitt. Joel Meyerowitz is included even though he hasn't been an active street shooter for 40 years.

Andrews also noted "various citation snafus", pointing to two descriptions of this as plagiarism.

Project
The accompanying Street Photography Now Project was a year-long collaboration between McLaren, Howarth and The Photographers' Gallery. The project was open to the public and participants were "invited to contribute a photograph each week following a weekly instruction" by a photographer.

Exhibitions
Street Photography Now, Third Floor Gallery, Cardiff, October–November 2010, and toured to Contributed Studio for the Arts, Berlin, December 2010 – January 2011; and the Museum of Printing, Historical Museum of Warsaw, Warsaw, November 2011 – January 2012.
Street Photography Now, shop windows throughout the Canal Saint-Martin area, part of Mois de la Photo-OFF, Paris, November 2010; Gallery Lichtblick, Cologne, 2010; and Uno Art Space, Stuttgart, April–June 2011.

Publication details
 (Hardback)
 (Paperback)
 (French-language edition)

Notes

References

Books of photographs
2010 non-fiction books
Thames & Hudson books